Siri Naga I was King of Anuradhapura in the 2nd century, whose reign lasted from 196 to 215. He succeeded his brother-in-law Kuda Naga as King of Anuradhapura and was succeeded by his son Voharika Tissa.

Historical texts state that he renovated Ruwanweliseya and renovated Lowamahapaya into a five storied structure and made stone steps at the entrances to the Sri Maha Bodhi.

See also
 List of Sri Lankan monarchs
 History of Sri Lanka

References

External links
 Kings & Rulers of Sri Lanka
 Codrington's Short History of Ceylon

S
S
S
S
S